Herring Hunt is a 1953 National Film Board of Canada short documentary film about the operations of a herring boat off the coast of British Columbia, directed by Julian Biggs, written by Leslie McFarlane and produced by Guy Glover, which was nominated for the Academy Award for Best Live Action Short Film at the 26th Academy Awards. The film's musical score was composed by Robert Fleming.

The 10-minute 47-second film follows Western Girl, her skipper and crew as they race to get their catch before quota is reached and their fishing area closed. In addition to its Oscar nomination, the Herring Hunt received a special mention at the Canadian Film Awards and a Second Award in the Category: Agricultural and Industrial at the Yorkton Film Festival.

See also
The Rising Tide, a 1949 NFB short documentary about fishing cooperatives in Canada's maritime provinces
Netz über Bord – Heringsfang auf der Nordsee, a 1955 West German documentary film about the herring industry

References

External links
 
 

1953 films
National Film Board of Canada documentaries
Films produced by Guy Glover
Films shot in British Columbia
Films set in British Columbia
Documentary films about fishing
Films scored by Robert Fleming
Fishing in Canada
Canada Carries On
Canadian short documentary films
Quebec films
1953 documentary films
1950s short documentary films
1950s Canadian films